Air Marshal Sir Patrick Hunter Dunn,  (31 December 1912 – 17 June 2004) was a Scottish Royal Air Force officer who served as Air Officer Commanding-in-Chief of Flying Training Command from 1964 to 1966.

RAF career
Educated at Loretto School and the University of Glasgow, Dunn joined the Royal Air Force 1933. He served in the Second World War as Officer Commanding No. 80 Squadron, Officer Commanding No. 274 Squadron and then a Station Commander at RAF Amriya. He had a total of nine combat victories. He continued his war service on the staff at Headquarters No. 203 Group before becoming Aide de Camp to Marshal of the Royal Air Force Lord Trenchard in 1942. He transferred to Headquarters RAF Fighter Command and became Group Captain, Operations at Headquarters No. 12 Group in 1944 and Sector Commander at RAF Coltishall in 1945.

After the war he was appointed Deputy Director of Personal Services at the Air Ministry and then became Senior Air Staff Officer at AHQ Malaya, in which role he used air power to combat the communist forces in the jungles on the ground during the Malayan Emergency. He went on to be an instructor at the NATO Defence College in 1951 before becoming Group Captain, Plans and then Air Commodore, Operations at Headquarters RAF Fighter Command in 1953. He was made Commandant of the RAF Flying College at Manby in 1956, Deputy Air Secretary in 1958 and Air Officer Commanding No. 1 Group in 1961. His final posting was as Air Officer Commanding-in-Chief of Flying Training Command in 1964 before retiring in 1967.

In retirement he became Chairman of the airline British Eagle.

Family
In 1939 he became married to Diana Ledward-Smith; they had two daughters.

References

|-

1912 births
2004 deaths
People educated at Loretto School, Musselburgh
Alumni of the University of Glasgow
British World War II flying aces
Scottish flying aces
Companions of the Order of the Bath
Knights Commander of the Order of the British Empire
Military personnel from Glasgow
Recipients of the Distinguished Flying Cross (United Kingdom)
Royal Air Force air marshals
Royal Air Force personnel of World War II